The Wump World by Bill Peet (1970) is a children's book taking place on an imaginary planet. It is about the near destruction of the only habitat of creatures known as Wumps. These Wumps look somewhat like a cross between a capybara (sometimes called a water hog) and a moose.

Plot
The story about these Wumps takes place on their own planet, hence the name The Wump World. A race of blue humanoids named the Pollutians overruns the Wump World, causing the Wumps to flee to the safety of caves. The Pollutians build great cities and colonise, dirtying the air, water, and plowing down entire forests and grasslands, which the Wumps rely on for food and water. The Pollutians reach trouble when the air becomes too polluted, and their leaders send scouts to search for another planet. One scout returns, claiming that he has found a bigger and better world; upon hearing this news the entire Pollutian populace leaves the planet, leaving their thickly polluted cities. When the world above grows quiet, the Wumps emerge to find a changed world, a deserted "concrete jungle". The Pollutians, having used up almost every natural resource, have left. Fortunately for the Wumps, they find a park still filled with still-living plant life (including trees and grass) and a river. Though the book ends with a message of hope about nature's ability to recover and a small plant sprouting up between the cracks of a sidewalk, it notes that the Wump World would never be quite the same.

The book is similar to Peet's previous work Farewell to Shady Glade. Dr. Seuss's The Lorax, another similar book, was also published the year after.

External links
THE WUMP WORLD at billpeet.net

American picture books
Environmental fiction books
Picture books by Bill Peet
Books by Bill Peet
1970 children's books